Nikola "Nicolas" Vitorović (born 13 May 1990 in Limassol) is a  Cypriot former footballer and current Head Coach of Bangladesh Police FC in Bangladesh Football Premier League. Already at 27 years of age, he made the books of History of Bangladesh Football becoming the youngest Head Coach to take over a Premier League club with  Brothers Union.

Career 
He started his football career with AEL Limassol where excellent youth potential brought him to make a short term move to English Premier League Club Blackburn Rovers F.C. but shortly returned to Cyprus and in 2006 was promoted to the Cypriot First Division team AEL Limassol. He played several games for the senior team in the 2007/2008 season and had appearances for the youth team, which led him to being honored with the prize of Best young player in Cyprus.
 
In 2008-09 he was given on loan to Chalkanoras Idaliou from the Cypriot Second Division, who played during his 8 months loan spell, 11 games and scoring 1 goal.

After his return in June 2009 was loaned for the 2009/2010 to another team this time Enosis Neon Parekklisia F.C.where he had 28 appearances and scored 9 goals. In 2010-11 he joined on permanently basis to Enosis Neon Parekklisia F.C. of the Cypriot Second Division on a free transfer, where he had 7 appearances and scored one goal. 2011-2012 played 24 games scoring 3 goals and having assisted 7 times. In 2012-2013 E.N. Pareklissias, In July 2014 he joined FK Nevėžis in A Lyga for the second half of the season. In first 6 games he scored 4 goals and then onwards gave 5 more assists in his 15 match appearance for the club till the end of his contract on 1 November 2014, while in FK Nevėžis he recorded 3 appearances in European Competitions.
After a successful half season in Lithuania a transfer to S. League Hougang United was the next move for the player making 5 appearances after the half season he left the club. 
End of January Romanian side Metalul Reșița who plays in Liga II who was in need of players signed Nikola Vitorovic till June where the player is now Captain and also Assistant Coach of Mr. Carol Gurgu.

August 2016 signed as player for Premier League club in Gozo Football League First Division club Xagħra United F.C. and also as Head Coach of Xagħra United F.C. U18 and also Director of Youth having made a record of 5 assists in the Maltese FA Trophy game Xagħra United F.C. vs Mtarfa F.C. 7-0.

August 2017 Nikola Vitorovic took another path in his career and took over as Head coach / Player position of Brothers Union Limited in Bangladesh Premier League and made an impact after saving the team which was last when he took over. The team finished in great 7th position with 22 points from those 2 points in 4 games before Vitorovic came. In 2018-2019 season he was announced at the mid end of season as Technical Director of the club with target to save the team again.
After a successful mission in 2 seasons with Brothers Union, his current team Bangladesh Police FC offered him a 1+1 year contract. In his stint there till up to date , he has taken the team to the final of DFA Challenge Cup and also the Semi-Final of the Federations Cup losing to the winner Bashundhara Kings.

Managerial Statistics
As of 31 December 2019

Honours
Coaching License Uefa A 2018

Coaching Licence Uefa B Serbia 2014

Best Cypriot Young Talented Player                2007-2008

A. Division Cup	Runner-up	          1x	  2008/2009 AEL Limassol

D. Division League Champion               1x      2009-2010 Enosis Neon Parekklisia F.C.

Cypriot Third Division Runner-up      1x      2010/2011 Enosis Neon Parekklisia F.C.

Notes

1990 births
Living people
Cypriot footballers
Sportspeople from Limassol
AEL Limassol players
Liga II players
CS Sportul Snagov players
Enosis Neon Paralimni FC players
Cypriot people of Montenegrin descent
Chalkanoras Idaliou players
Cypriot expatriate footballers
Cypriot expatriate sportspeople in Romania
Expatriate footballers in Romania
Association football forwards
Association football midfielders
Cypriot people of Serbian descent